Nancy Borwick (20 March 1935 – 24 November 2013) was an Australian athlete. She competed in the women's long jump at the 1956 Summer Olympics.

References

1935 births
2013 deaths
Athletes (track and field) at the 1956 Summer Olympics
Australian female long jumpers
Olympic athletes of Australia
Place of birth missing